Uğur Kavuk (born September 11, 1979 in Zonguldak, Turkey) is a Turkish footballer who last played as a fullback for Ödemişspor.

References

External links

1979 births
Living people
Turkish footballers
Zonguldakspor footballers
İstanbul Başakşehir F.K. players
Antalyaspor footballers
Sivasspor footballers
Gaziantepspor footballers
Süper Lig players
Association football defenders